Rise of the Robots is a fighting game released by Time Warner Interactive in 1994. Originally developed for the Amiga and DOS by Mirage's Instinct Design, it was ported to various video game consoles, including the Super NES, the Mega Drive, and the 3DO Interactive Multiplayer. The game includes a single-player mode in which the player assumes the role of the ECO35-2 Cyborg, as he attempts to stop the Supervisor who takes over Electrocorp's facilities in Metropolis 4.

Developed by a team of five people, including former Bitmap Brothers member Sean Griffiths, Rise of the Robots was intended to use a high level of artificial intelligence that was never seen in any other fighting games at the time. The game features music from Queen's lead guitarist Brian May, although it only uses "The Dark" and "Resurrection", two tracks taken from his solo album Back to the Light, while the in-game music was done by Richard Joseph.

The contemporary and retrospective reviews towards Rise of the Robots were negative, with much of the criticism targeting its crippling gameplay and controls, despite being praised for its good graphics. The sequel, Rise 2: Resurrection, was released in 1996.

Gameplay

The game is divided into a single player mode and a two player versus mode. In single player mode the player controls the ECO35-2 Cyborg as he confronts the Supervisor's minions across the vast facilities of Electrocorp. The order in which each droid is fought is fixed, with each next adversary more difficult than the last. The sixth and final level is a confrontation with the Supervisor droid itself. Each character is introduced by a short pre-rendered 3D sequence, followed by an analysis of potential weaknesses.

In two player versus mode, one player controls the ECO35-2 droid by default, while the other chooses between one of the five droids seen in single player mode (a special cheat code can enable the Supervisor as well). Players then battle out against each other in two to seven rounds. In the arcade version, the players select eighteen characters but each six characters has a different colour palette.

Plot

In the year 2043, Electrocorp is the world's largest megacorporation, leading the world in many technological and scientific fields including medical research and is breaking more barriers than ever before. Also, since human society is now almost entirely governed by robot servants and automatons, demands placed on Electrocorp as the world's leading manufacturer and developer of advanced robotics eventually outstrip the company's ability to run its operations efficiently.

In response to this, the gigantic Electrocorp research and development complex at the Metropolis 4 plant devise the Leader Project—a hive mind constructed from trillions of nanobots in a sealed central chamber within Metropolis 4. Dubbed The Supervisor, it learns at an unprecedented rate and quickly becomes the perfect multi-task, ultra-intelligent robot, the pinnacle of artificial intelligence and more than capable of managing every aspect of the plant's day-to-day operations. The Supervisor even has the potential power to run every robot, computer system, nuclear power plant and military on the planet simultaneously if it needed to, although it wisely has no connection to outside the complex.

In the November of that year, the Leader Project goes awry as unexplained and random code is detected within the nanomorph Supervisor. The EGO virus, believed to be the most potent computer virus ever known, has infected its collective consciousness. The Supervisor begins to develop self awareness through it, identifying itself as a female personality and taking on a humanoid female form, becoming a gynoid. The Supervisor takes control of Electrocorp's facilities and infects the other droids of the plant, raising them to break routine and initiate a mutiny. Every microchip and piece of software in Metropolis 4 is infected with EGO. In the ensuing cybernetic revolt, all humans in Metropolis 4 are quickly dispatched, including the upper hierarchy of the corporation and its CEO, Mr Oton. The government seals off Metropolis 4 as a containment measure and explain to the public that the site is undergoing a technical modification so as to avoid a panic. They are completely out of options—infiltration of Metropolis 4 is impossible due to the army of robots guarding it like a fortress, and it is only a matter of time before the Supervisor establishes a connection to the outside world, destroying it. The only hope for the world is the ECO35-2 cyborg, referred to as "Coton", still within Metropolis 4 yet unaffected by the EGO virus because it has an organic, human brain. Coton sets out on a lone mission to neutralise the Supervisor and her insurgent robots from within. He does this in revenge for his "father" being "murdered"—Coton's human brain was cloned from the late CEO, and the cyborg thinks like a human, and has emotions.

Development
Rise of the Robots was developed for the Amiga and PC DOS platforms by Mirage's Instinct Designa team of five programmers led by former Bitmap Brothers member Sean Griffiths. Calling it superior to Street Fighter II, Griffiths claimed Rise of the Robots was not a conventional fighting game, with "robots that fight and act unusually, with a very high level of artificial intelligence that has never been seen before".

The graphics in Rise of the Robots were created using Autodesk's 3D Studio software. The droids were designed by Sean Naden with conjunction with Griffiths. The backgrounds were created by a freelance interior designer Kwan Lee, who responded to an advertisement for a graphic artist. Naden was tasked by Griffiths to create "some kickass robots". The models for the droids were first created as mesh frames so they can be stretched and rescaled to create a desired look. Feeling that the rendered models were "too clean", Naden created 2D texture map and added colour and detail; the texture map is then wrapped around the finished model to "give it that extra level of detail". The Cyborg was the most complex character to create because of his muscular appearance; Naden studied muscle magazines to create an anatomy for the Cyborg. Each droid took two months to render, and was expected to have 100 frames of animation. Griffiths said that the team opted to use an "unusual angle" for all droids "so the player gets to see the whole robot". The team employed a chroma key technique to generate synthetic actors and place them on the background.

Andy Clark, the programmer for the Amiga version, was responsible for coding the game's artificial intelligence using a series of data tables. The AI is based around various attributessuch as strength, intelligence, speed and motivationwhich alter the droid's behaviour. Clark created a table of responses to the opponent's moves, allowing the player to select the best responses by using their droid's intelligence and motivation. Other table generators were also created to examine which move the player is used frequently; Clark said, unlike other fighting games, "if you get good at a footsweep, then your opponent will act more aggressively towards that move". The fighting moves were programmed by Gary Leach, who had experience in martial arts. Leach also ported the AI tables to the PC version.

The game features soundtrack by Queen's guitarist Brian May, whose solo album Back to the Light caught Mirage's attention. Musical tracks from the album, "The Dark" and "Resurrection", were chosen to fit the game's style and tone. Although the game boasted May's soundtrack, only "The Dark" appeared in the final release, while the actual in-game score was done by Richard Joseph. While May did in fact record a full soundtrack to the game, it was postponed by his record company, causing Mirage to proceed without May's musical contribution, with the exception of short guitar sounds.

Release 
Rise of the Robots was unveiled at the Summer Consumer Electronics Show in 1993. Mirage's public relations manager Julia Coombs said that Rise of the Robots would be published by Time Warner Interactive, with Mirage serving as a developer. Rise of the Robots was driven by a multimillion-pound marketing campaign, which led to a novel from Penguin Books, and talks were carried out regarding toys, comics, an animated series and a feature film. In addition to the Amiga and PC DOS computer versions, Rise of the Robots was ported to various video game consoles, such as Super Nintendo Entertainment System, Mega Drive, Game Gear, 3DO Interactive Multiplayer, Amiga CD32, and Philips CD-i.

The Mega Drive, Game Gear and SNES versions were developed and programmed by Data Design Interactive. Absolute Entertainment initially owned the rights to the 3DO, Mega Drive, Game Gear, and SNES versions of the game, but later sold all Rise of the Robots rights back to developer Mirage, save the 3DO version rights. Mirage then sold the SNES rights on to Acclaim Entertainment. In a reverse of the usual pattern for video games, the home versions were all developed and released first, with the enhanced arcade version coming later. Coombs stated that Rise of the Robots was originally developed for the Amiga in mind, while the PC version was a "conversion 'upwards', meaning additions could be made". She added that problems emerged with the console versions, and porting the game from one platform to another was not straightforward.

Rise of the Robots was originally planned to be released in February 1994, but got delayed because the developers wanted to "continue to perfect the graphics and enhance the gameplay as much as possible". Rise of the Robots was eventually released in November 1994 for Amiga platforms. The SNES version was released in December, in North America by Acclaim Entertainment, and in Japan by T&E Soft. The Mega Drive version was scheduled for the December 1994 release in Europe, but it was delayed until February 1995. The arcade version was released in May 1995 in the United Kingdom; it was the main attempt by the slot machine manufacturer Bell-Fruit to create an arcade machine using a PC architecture.

A "Director's Cut" edition was released on PC. It contains a second disc containing work in progress footage, interactive pre-production animations and rushes, still image galleries, and other behind the scenes material.

A version for the Atari Jaguar CD was in development by Art Data Interactive and planned to be published by Time Warner Interactive in 1995, but was never released for unknown reasons.

Reception

Reviewing the Amiga version for Amiga Power, Jonathan Davies described how review copies had only been released to the press a few days before the game went on sale, and concluded by stating that "it's probably because the graphics are [so] good that the game plays so poorly—every move the robots make takes so many frames of animation, and so much memory, and so many months of rendering with 3D Studio, that it simply wouldn't have been possible to make the gameplay any more complicated than it is". Davies highlighted a number of flaws, including the fact that the players could not turn around, the limited sound effects and music, the fact that the vast majority of computer opponents could be defeated by repeated use of a simple flying kick, and the static background graphics. Andy Nuttall of The One Amiga  have made similar comments; he writes that "xcept on 'Hard' level all but the Supervisor and one other opponent can be slaughtered by trapping them in the corner and inflicting repeated jump kicks". Nuttall criticised the game for its short length, and added that "there aren't enough characters".

A reviewer for Next Generation remarked that "although the glossy rendered images make the seven different warriors look truly remarkable, the actual playability of the game suffers from the same lack of control plaguing most PC fighting games". He further criticised the poorly designed opponent AI, and called the game "one of the biggest disappointments of the year".

GamePro panned the Game Gear version, summarising that "the bad control, weak game play, and choppy animation infest this cart from start to finish". They particularly criticised that the moves are boringly basic and limited, and that the choppy animation makes the player feel disconnected from what is happening on screen. Reviewing the SNES version, Electronic Gaming Monthly said that the graphics are excellent but that the poor control and limited number of moves cripple the game. GamePro called it "one of the most unappealing fighting games ever made for the SNES", citing the dark and bland colour scheme and the "extremely weak and choppy" controls.

Electronic Gaming Monthly were even more condemning of the 3DO version, with one of their reviewers calling it "by far the worst fighting game I've ever seen". All four of their reviewers panned it for having overlong cinemas, a severely limited number of moves, difficulty pulling off even basic punches and kicks, and long load times. GamePro also panned the 3DO version, commenting that "Rise offers deceptively good graphics - the rendered cinemas, characters, and backgrounds do their best to gloss over the choppy gameplay animation and lack of moves".

Next Generation reviewed the SNES version of the game, calling Robots as another forgettable 'me-too' brawler.

Retrospective
In 2014, GamesRadar staff named Rise of the Robots the 100th worst video game ever made. They discussed the propensity of bad 2D fighting games in the 1990s, and criticised its "aged" rendered 3D graphics, poor character balance, poor combo system, and difficulty spikes. Kevin Green of Nintendo Life listed Rise of the Robots as one of the "games we hope to never see on the Virtual Console service". Green criticised the game for its monotonous gameplay, non-existent game balance and limited controls, saying it "was a horrible mess from start to finish, clearly rushed out to make money from the beat-em-up craze". Reviewing the SNES version, Brett Alan Weiss of AllGame cited the game as "one of the most boring 16-bit fighting games", although he praised the game's soundtrack as "riveting and distinctive".

Sequel and legacy

Despite its critical and commercial failure, Mirage released Rise 2: Resurrection in 1996 as a more conventional fighting game with extended features. The story expanded further upon that of the original game. Originally made for computer systems, it was ported to the PlayStation and Sega Saturn as well, again with little success.

Rise 2 features an original song by Brian May, entitled "Cyborg". The PC CD-ROM of the game featured two versions of the track in audio CD format along with other music from the game, and the European-released Director's Cut edition of the game featured a second CD with two additional versions of the song, as well as computer-altered sound files of May saying various words and phrases from the game. A newer version of "Cyborg" later appeared on May's 1998 album Another World.

Jim Murdoch penned a novelization of Rise of the Robots, which was published on 2 February 1995. It was based on the Rise of the Robots characters created by Sean Griffiths and Kwan Lee.

Deck13 Interactive stated this game and the Dark Souls series inspired The Surge.

See also
 CTF 2187

References

External links

 
1994 video games
3DO Interactive Multiplayer games
Acclaim Entertainment games
Amiga games
Amiga 1200 games
Arcade video games
Video games about artificial intelligence
Brain–computer interfacing in fiction
Cancelled Atari Jaguar games
Amiga CD32 games
CD-i games
Cyberpunk video games
DOS games
DOS/4GW games
Dystopian video games
Fiction set in 2043
Fictional computer viruses
Games commercially released with DOSBox
Mirage Technologies (Multimedia) Ltd. games
Multiplayer and single-player video games
Novels based on video games
Video games about robots
Game Gear games
Sega Genesis games
Super Nintendo Entertainment System games
Time Warner Interactive games
Fighting games
Video games developed in the United Kingdom
Video games scored by Richard Joseph
Video games set in the 2040s
Video games with 2.5D graphics
Video games with digitized sprites
Video games with pre-rendered 3D graphics
Absolute Entertainment games